The following is a compilation of notable records and statistics for teams and players in and seasons of North American Soccer League.

All-Time Regular Season Successes 

Through completion of 2013 regular season.

All-Time Regular Season Records 

Through completion of 2013 regular season.

Highest scoring games

Biggest winning margin

Streaks

Winning streaks

Undefeated streaks

italics streaks still active, as of April 19, 2014

Losing streaks

Winless streaks

Average Season Attendances

 Highest single attendance - 13,151 San Antonio Scorpions vs Puerto Rico Islanders, 15 April 2012.
 Lowest single attendance - 520 Puerto Rico Islanders vs FC Edmonton, 18 April 2012.
 Highest average attendance - 11,507 Montreal Impact, 2011 Season.
 Lowest average attendance - 1,525 FC Edmonton, 2012 Season.

Trivia
 The longest unbeaten end to a season was achieved by the New York Cosmos in 2013, who closed the campaign thirteen matches unbeaten (with eight wins and three draws).
 The highest number of points achieved by a team during a regular season (inclusive of Spring / Fall) was 54 (17–3–8), by Carolina RailHawks in 2011.
 The lowest number of points achieved by a team during a regular season (inclusive of Spring / Fall) was 16 (4-4-20), by Atlanta Silverbacks in 2011.
 The highest number of points achieved by a team at home during a regular season (inclusive of Spring / Fall) was 34 (11-1-2), by Carolina RailHawks in 2011.
 The highest number of points achieved by a team on the road during a regular season (inclusive of Spring / Fall) was 20 (5-5-4), by the San Antonio Scorpions in 2012.
 The highest number of points achieved by a team on in a split season 31 (9-4-1), by the New York Cosmos in Fall 2013.
 The lowest number of points achieved by a team on in a split season 8 (2-2-8), by the Fort Lauderdale Strikers in Spring 2013.

See also 
Major League Soccer records and statistics

Notes 

Records and statistics
All-time football league tables
Soccer records and statistics in the United States
Association football league records and statistics